Nikita Lastochkin (born May 5, 1990) is a Russian racing driver, who moved to the United States at the age of 16 years, and currently resides in Los Angeles, California.

Career
He began racing in 2013 where he completed the 3 day Skip Barber Racing School and went on to race in the Championship.  That year he placed 2nd in the Winter Championship and awarded “Most Improved.”  He also participated in the 2014 Summer Racing Series, where he placed 3rd in the Championship.  In 2014, Nikita also competed in the Pacific Region F1600 Championship Series, with PR1 where he claimed 2 wins. Nikita then moved to the Atlantic Region with Team Pelfrey, where he would place 6th overall in the F1600 Championship Series; with two podiums, a pole position and a lap record at Watkins Glen International.

Racing record

F1600 Championship Series

U.S. F2000 National Championship - Winterfest

U.S. F2000 National Championship

Pro Mazda Championship

Indy Lights

References

External links
 
 

1990 births
Living people
Racing drivers from Los Angeles
Russian racing drivers
U.S. F2000 National Championship drivers
Indy Pro 2000 Championship drivers
Toyota Racing Series drivers
Indy Lights drivers
Team Pelfrey drivers
Wayne Taylor Racing drivers
HMD Motorsports drivers